Wellington Airport may refer to:

 Wellington Airport in Wellington, New Zealand (IATA: WLG)
 Wellington Municipal Airport in Wellington, Kansas, United States (FAA: EGT)

Other airports in places named Wellington:
 Reader-Botsford Airport in Wellington, Ohio, United States (FAA: 67D)
 Marian Airpark in Wellington, Texas, United States (FAA: F06)
 Wellington Aerodrome in Wellington, New South Wales, Australia (ICAO code YWEL)